The 2019 Sydney International was a tournament on the 2019 ATP Tour and 2019 WTA Tour. It was played on outdoor hard courts in Sydney, New South Wales, Australia.

It was the 127th edition of the tournament and took place at the NSW Tennis Centre. It was held from 6 to 12 January 2019 as part of the Australian Open Series in preparation for the first Grand Slam of the year.

Points and prize money

Point distribution

Prize money 

1Qualifiers prize money is also the Round of 32 prize money.
*per team

ATP singles main-draw entrants

Seeds 

 1 Rankings are as of 31 December 2018.

Other entrants 
The following players received wildcards into the singles main draw:
  James Duckworth 
  Alexei Popyrin
  Jordan Thompson

The following players received entry from the qualifying draw:
  Guillermo García López
  Yoshihito Nishioka
  Reilly Opelka 
  Andrey Rublev

The following players received entry as lucky losers: 
  Guido Andreozzi
  Taro Daniel

Withdrawals 
Before the tournament
  Kyle Edmund → replaced by  Sam Querrey
  Nicolás Jarry → replaced by  Guido Andreozzi
  Daniil Medvedev → replaced by  Taro Daniel
  Jo-Wilfried Tsonga → replaced by  Denis Kudla

Retirements 
  Malek Jaziri

ATP doubles main-draw entrants

Seeds 

 1 Rankings are as of 31 December 2018.

Other entrants 
The following pairs received wildcards into the doubles main draw:
  Alex Bolt /  Matt Reid
  Lleyton Hewitt /  Jordan Thompson

The following pair received entry as alternates:
  Luke Bambridge /  Jonny O'Mara

Withdrawals 
Before the tournament
  Nicolás Jarry
  Malek Jaziri

WTA singles main-draw entrants

Seeds 

 1 Rankings are as of 31 December 2018.

Other entrants 
The following players received wildcards into the singles main draw:
  Daria Gavrilova
  Petra Kvitová
  Samantha Stosur
  Ajla Tomljanović

The following player received entry using a protected ranking into the singles main draw: 
  Timea Bacsinszky

The following players received entry from the qualifying draw:
  Ekaterina Alexandrova
  Danielle Collins
  Priscilla Hon
  Yulia Putintseva
  Aliaksandra Sasnovich
  Kateřina Siniaková

The following players received entry as lucky losers:
 Johanna Konta
 Tatjana Maria
 Bernarda Pera
 Monica Puig

Withdrawals 
Before the tournament
 Naomi Osaka → replaced by  Monica Puig
 Karolína Plíšková → replaced by  Tatjana Maria
 Lesia Tsurenko → replaced by  Bernarda Pera

During the tournament

 Garbiñe Muguruza (GI Illness)

WTA doubles main-draw entrants

Seeds 

 1 Rankings are as of 31 December 2018.

Other entrants 
The following pair received a wildcard into the doubles main draw:
  Priscilla Hon /  Ajla Tomljanović

Champions

Men's singles 

  Alex de Minaur def.  Andreas Seppi, 7–5, 7–6(7–5)

Women's singles 

  Petra Kvitová def.  Ashleigh Barty 1–6, 7–5, 7–6(7–6)

Men's doubles 

  Jamie Murray /  Bruno Soares def.  Juan Sebastián Cabal /  Robert Farah, 6–4, 6–3

Women's doubles 

  Aleksandra Krunić /  Kateřina Siniaková def.  Eri Hozumi /  Alicja Rosolska, 6–1, 7–6(7–3)

References

External links